Good News may refer to:

Arts, entertainment, and media

Films and musicals
Good News (musical), opened on Broadway in 1927
Good News (1930 film), an American MGM musical film based on the stage production starring Bessie Love
Good News (1947 film), an American MGM musical film based on the stage production starring June Allyson
Good News (1954 film), a Spanish comedy film
Good News (1979 film), an Italian satirical comedy film starring Giancarlo Giannini
Good News, a 1990 film by Ulrich Seidl
Good News (2019 film), an Indian romantic comedy film
Taurus (2022 film), also known as Good News

Literature
Good News (novel), a 1980 novel by Edward Abbey
Good News, a 1945 non-fiction work by Cyril Alington

Music

Albums
Good News (Cliff Richard album), 1967
Good News, a 1975 album by Pasadena Roof Orchestra
Good News, a 1981 album by Sweet Honey in the Rock
Good News (Lena album), 2011, or the title song
Good News (Kathy Mattea album), 1993, or the title song
Good News (Matt Dusk album), 2009, or the title song
Good News (Withered Hand album)
Good News (Ian Yates album), 2012
Good News (Bryan Rice album), 2007, or the title song
The Good News (album), a 2015 album by All Things New
Good News (Rend Collective album) A 2018 album by Rend Collective
Good News (Megan Thee Stallion album), 2020

Songs
 Good News (Louis Gottlieb song), 1959
 "Good News" (Jody Miller song), 1973
 "Good News" (Ocean Park Standoff song), 2016
 "Good News" (Mac Miller song), 2020
"Good News", a 1998 song by Ringo Starr from Vertical Man
 "Good News", a 2018 single by Mandisa
 "Good News", a 2021 song by Pop Smoke from Faith
 "Ain't That Good News" (song), also known as "Good News", a 1964 song by Sam Cooke

Religious publications
Good News Bible (GNB), an English translation of the Bible by the American Bible Society
The Good News (magazine), a religious magazine published by the United Church of God

Television
Good News (TV series), a 1997 American situation comedy broadcast
Russell Howard's Good News, a BBC comedy and topical news show television broadcast 
"The Good News" (Mad Men), a 2010 episode of Mad Men

Other uses in arts, entertainment, and media
Good News (duo), an American duo who appeared on The X Factor (U.S. TV series)
Good News Awards, a journalism award

Other uses
The gospel (or Good News), the message of Jesus
Good News Club v. Milford Central School, a 2001 U.S. Supreme Court case
Macintosh's Good News, a box of chocolates on which George Harrison based the lyric of The Beatles' "Savoy Truffle"